Long Lake is a lake in St. Lawrence County, upstate New York on the edge of the High Peaks Wilderness Area.

It is located 16 miles west of Newcomb and about 70 miles southeast of Kalurah, New York.

Fish species present in the lake are brook trout, and black bullhead. Access is via Bushwhack Trail from Mud Creek.

References

Lakes of St. Lawrence County, New York
Lakes of New York (state)